Sigua can mean:

 Tengiz Sigua
 Sigua (vegetable)
 Sigua River, in Guam
 Sigua Falls, in Guam
 Sigua, in Siguatepeque